Enchanter is a 1996 fantasy novel by Australian writer Sara Douglass. It follows the first book in the series, Battleaxe, with Axis journeying to the Icarii stronghold to receive his heritage.

Background
Enchanter was first published in Australia in 1996 by HarperCollins in paperback format. It was later released in the United States in hardback and paperback in 2001 and 2002 respectively. Enchanter won the 1996 Aurealis Award for best fantasy novel in a three-way tie with Douglass' other novel StarMan and Jack Dann's The Memory Cathedral.

References

External links

1996 Australian novels
1996 fantasy novels
Australian fantasy novels
Novels by Sara Douglass
Aurealis Award-winning works
Voyager Books books